Victoria Smith (born 8 January 1983) is a New Zealand netball player in the ANZ Championship, who has played in both Australia, New Zealand and international competitions. Representing the Wellington-based franchise, Central Pulse team in the 2011, 2012 and 2013 season. She has previously played for the Canterbury Tactix in 2008, 2009 and 2010. From 2005 - 2007 Victoria Smith represented the Capital Shakers team, in now defunct National Bank Cup and prior to this played for the Queensland Firebirds in the Australian Commonwealth Bank Cup.  She also represented the Australian 19 and under team in 2002–2003. Smith specialises in the positions of GK and GD (Goal keep and Goal defence).

After relocating to Hong Kong Victoria represented Hong Kong National team in international competitions. 

Victoria Smith received a scholarship from the University of Queensland whilst representing the Queensland Firebirds and Australia under-age teams.

References
http://www.nzherald.co.nz/sport/news/article.cfm?c_id=4&objectid=10872315
http://www.upandin.com.au/interviews-and-tips/69
http://www.mynetball.co.nz/news/379-canterbury-tactix.html
Canterbury Tactix profile
Central Pulse Profile

1983 births
Living people
New Zealand netball players
Central Pulse players
Mainland Tactix players
ANZ Championship players
Capital Shakers players